Sandy Rothman (born January 30, 1946, Miami, Florida) is an American, San Francisco Bay Area bluegrass multi-instrumentalist and record producer.  He plays mandolin, dobro and banjo, and he also sings.  Rothman was a friend and colleague of Grateful Dead bandleader Jerry Garcia, and a member of the Jerry Garcia Acoustic Band. He played bluegrass with Garcia and David Nelson as the Black Mountain Boys in 1964, and has played with Bill Monroe and his Blue Grass Boys, Earl Taylor, Red Allen, Jimmie Skinner, Larry Sparks, the Kentucky Colonels, Country Joe McDonald, Kathy Kallick and Clarence White, among other musicians. He has been described as "one of the chief biscuits when and where bluegrass music is discussed, scribed, or performed in northern California."

Discography
Almost Acoustic – Jerry Garcia Acoustic Band – Arista Records (1988) (producer and performer)
The Old Road to Home – Sandy Rothman – Tonebar Records (1993) (producer and performer)
Bluegrass Guitar Duets – Sandy Rothman and Steve Pottier – Sierra Records (1994)
Pure Jerry: Lunt-Fontanne, New York City, October 31, 1987 – Jerry Garcia Band and Jerry Garcia Acoustic Band – Jerry Made Records (2004)
Pure Jerry: Lunt-Fontanne, New York City, The Best of the Rest, October 15–30, 1987 – Jerry Garcia Band and Jerry Garcia Acoustic Band – Jerry Made Records (2004) 
Songs of the Grateful Dead: A Tribute to Jerry Garcia and Robert Hunter – Jesse McReynolds and Friends, feat. David Nelson and Stu Allen – Woodstock Records (2010) (producer and performer)
Ragged but Right – Jerry Garcia Acoustic Band – Jerry Made Records (2010) (recorded in 1987) (producer and performer)
On Broadway: Act One – October 28th, 1987 – Jerry Garcia Band and Jerry Garcia Acoustic Band – ATO Records (2015)
Electric on the Eel – included on the Jerry Garcia Acoustic Band bonus disc Acoustic on the Eel (2019)

References

External links

Rothman at Woodstock Records website
"Jerry's Banjo Years", article on Jerry Garcia by Rothman

American bluegrass mandolinists
Living people
Grateful Dead
American country banjoists
American country singer-songwriters
American bluegrass guitarists
American male guitarists
Musicians from the San Francisco Bay Area
1946 births
20th-century American guitarists
Jerry Garcia Acoustic Band members
Singer-songwriters from California